This is a list of law enforcement agencies in the state of Alabama.

According to the US Bureau of Justice Statistics' 2008 Census of State and Local Law Enforcement Agencies, the state had 417 law enforcement agencies employing 11,631 sworn police officers, about 251 for each 100,000 residents.

State Agencies 
Alabama Law Enforcement Agency 
Alabama Department of Conservation and Natural Resources
Alabama Wildlife and Freshwater Fisheries Division 
Conservation Enforcement Division
Alabama Board of Pardons and Parole
Alabama State Parks Ranger Service
Alabama State Lands Security
 Alabama Department of Corrections
Bureau of Special Investigations
Alabama Department of Mental Health Police
Alabama Securities Commission
Alabama State Port Authority Police
Alabama Department of Insurance
State Fire Marshal's Office
 Marshals of the Alabama Appellate Courts
Alabama National Guard Military Police/Security Forces (under state gubernatorial control unless federalized under Title 10 of the United States Code)

County sheriff agencies 

Autauga County Sheriff's Office
Baldwin County Sheriff's Office
Barbour County Sheriff's Office
Bibb County Sheriff's Department
Blount County Sheriff's Office
Bullock County Sheriff's Office
Butler County Sheriff's Office
Calhoun County Sheriff's Office
Chambers County Sheriff's Office
Cherokee County Sheriff's Department
Chilton County Sheriff's Department
Choctaw County Sheriff's Department
Clarke County Sheriff's Office
Clay County Sheriff's Office
Cleburne County Sheriff's Office
Coffee County Sheriff's Office
Colbert County Sheriff's Department
Conecuh County Sheriff's Office
Coosa County Sheriff's Office
Covington County Sheriff's Office
Crenshaw County Sheriff's Office
Cullman County Sheriff's Office
Dale County Sheriff's Office

Dallas County Sheriff's Office
DeKalb County Sheriff's Office
Elmore County Sheriff's Office
Escambia County Sheriff's Department
Etowah County Sheriff's Office
Fayette County Sheriff's Office
Franklin County Sheriff's Office
Geneva County Sheriff's Office
Greene County Sheriff's Office
Hale County Sheriff's Office
Henry County Sheriff's Office
Houston County Sheriff's Department
Jackson County Sheriff's Office
Jefferson County Sheriff's Department
Lamar County Sheriff's Office
Lauderdale County Sheriff's Office
Lawrence County Sheriff's Office
Lee County Sheriff's Department
Limestone County Sheriff's Office
Lowndes County Sheriff's Office
Macon County Sheriff's Office
Madison County Sheriff's Department

Marengo County Sheriff's Office
 Marion County Sheriff's Office
Marshall County Sheriff's Office
Mobile County Sheriff's Department
Monroe County Sheriff's Office
Montgomery County Sheriff's Office
 Morgan County Sheriff's Office
Perry County Sheriff's Office
Pickens County Sheriff's Office
Pike County Sheriff's Office
Randolph County Sheriff's Office
Russell County Sheriff's Office
Saint Clair County Sheriff's Office
Shelby County Sheriff's Department
Sumter County Sheriff's Office
Talladega County Sheriff's Office
Tallapoosa County Sheriff's Department
Tuscaloosa County Sheriff's Office
Walker County Sheriff's Department
Washington County Sheriff's Department
Wilcox County Sheriff's Office
Winston County Sheriff's Office

County constable agencies 

 Barbour County Constable’s Office
Colbert County Constable’s Office
Conecuh County Constable’s Office
Coosa County Constable’s Office
 Dallas County Constable’s Office
 DeKalb County Constable’s Office
Elmore County Constable’s Office
Etowah County Constable’s Office
 Franklin County Constable’s Office
 Greene County Constable’s Office
Jackson County Constable’s Office
 Jefferson County Constable’s Office
Marengo County Constable’s Office
 Marion County Constable’s Office
 Mobile County Constable’s Office
Monroe County Constable’s Office
 Russell County Constable’s Office
Sumter County Constable’s Office
 Talladega County Constable’s Office
Tallapoosa County Constable’s Office
 Walker County Constable’s Office
Wilcox County Constable’s Office
 Winston County Constable’s Office

Local agencies 

Abbeville Police Department
Adamsville Police Department
Alabaster Police Department
Albertville Police Department
 Alexander City Police Department
 Aliceville Police Department
 Altoona Police Department
 Andalusia Police Department
Anderson Police Department
 Anniston Police Department
 Arab Police Department
 Ardmore Police Department
Argo Police Department
Ariton Police Department
Ashford Police Department
Ashland Police Department
Ashville Police Department
Athens Police Department
Atmore Police Department
Attalla Police Department
Auburn Police Department
Autaugaville Police Department
Bakerhill Police Department
Bay Minette Police Department
Bayou La Batre Police Department
Berry Police Department
Bessemer Police Department
Birmingham Police Department
Blountsville Police Department
Boaz Police Department
Brantley Police Department
Brent Police Department
Brewton Police Department
Bridgeport Police Department
Brookwood Police Department
Brundidge Police Department
Butler Police Department
Calera Police Department
Camden Police Department
Camp Hill Police Department
Carbon Hill Police Department
Carrollton Police Department
Castleberry Police Department
Cedar Bluff Police Department
Centre Police Department
Centreville Police Department
Chatom Police Department
Cherokee Police Department
Chickasaw Police Department
Childersburg Police Department
Citronelle Police Department
Clanton Police Department
Clayton Police Department
Clio Police Department
Collinsville Police Department
Columbiana Police Department
Cordova Police Department
Cottonwood Police Department
Courtland Police Department
Creola Police Department
Crossville Police Department
Cullman Police Department
[[Chapel Hill Community is being patrolled by the Two Police Departments 
Florala Police Department,in S Group
Dadeville Police Department
Daleville Police Department
Daphne Police Department
Dauphin Island Police Department
Decatur Police Department
Demopolis Police Department
Dora Police Department
Dothan Police Department
Double Springs Police Department
Douglas Police Department
East Brewton Police Department
Eclectic Police Department
Elba Police Department
Elberta Police Department
Enterprise Police Department
Eufaula Police Department
Eutaw Police Department
Evergreen Police Department
Excel Police Department
Fairfield Police Department
Fairhope Police Department
Falkville Police Department
Fayette Police Department
Flomaton Police Department
Florala Police Department
Florence Police Department
Foley Police Department
Fort Deposit Police Department
Fort Payne Police Department
Frisco City Police Department

Fultondale Police Department
Fyffe Police Department
Gadsden Police Department
Gardendale Police Department
Geneva Police Department
Georgiana Police Department
Geraldine Police Department
Glencoe Police Department
Goodwater Police Department
Gordo Police Department
Grant Police Department
Graysville Police Department
Greensboro Police Department
Greenville Police Department
Grove Hill Police Department
Guin Police Department
Gulf Shores Police Department
Guntersville Police Department
Haleyville Police Department
Hamilton Police Department
Hanceville Police Department
Harpersville Police Department
Hartford Police Department
Hartselle Police Department
Headland Police Department
Heflin Police Department
Helena Police Department
Henagar Police Department
 Hokes Bluff Police Department
Hollywood Police Department
Homewood Police Department
Hoover Police Department
Hueytown Police Department
Huntsville Police Department
Irondale Police Department
Jackson Police Department
Jacksonville Police Department
Jasper Police Department
Jemison Police Department
Kennedy Police Department
Kimberly Police Department
Kinston Police Department
Lafayette Police Department
Lake View Police Department
Lanett Police Department
Leeds Police Department
Leighton Police Department
Level Plains Police Department
Lincoln Police Department
Linden Police Department
Lineville Police Department
Littleville Police Department
Livingston Police Department
Lockhart Police Department
Louisville Police Department
Loxley Police Department
Luverne Police Department
Madison Police Department
Maplesville Police Department
Margaret Police Department
Marion Police Department
Mentone Police Department
Midfield Police Department
Midland City Police Department
Millbrook Police Department
Millport Police Department
Millry Police Department
Mobile Police Department
Monroeville Police Department
Montevallo Police Department 
Montgomery Police Department
Moody Police Department
Morris Police Department
Moulton Police Department
Moundville Police Department
Mount Vernon Police Department
Mountain Brook Police Department
Muscle Shoals Police Department
Myrtlewood Police Department
Napier Field Police Department
New Brockton Police Department
New Hope Police Department

New Site Police Department
Newton Police Department
North Courtland Police Department
Northport Police Department
Oakman Police Department
Odenville Police Department
Ohatchee Police Department
Oneonta Police Department
Opelika Police Department
Opp Police Department Police Department
Orange Beach Police Department
Oxford Police Department
Ozark Police Department
Parrish Police Department
Pelham Police Department
Pell City Police Department
Pennington Police Department
Phenix City Police Department
Phil Campbell Police Department
Piedmont Police Department
Pine Hill Police Department
Prattville Police Department
Priceville Police Department
Prichard Police Department
Ragland Police Department
Rainbow City Police Department
Rainsville Police Department
Red Bay Police Department
Red Level Police Department
Reform Police Department
Riverside Police Department
Roanoke Police Department
Robertsdale Police Department
Rogersville Police Department
Russellville Police Department
Samson Police Department 
Saraland Police Department
Sardis City Police Department
Satsuma Police Department
Scottsboro Police Department
Section Police Department
Selma Police Department
Sheffield Police Department
Sipsey Police Department
Slocomb Police Department
Snead Police Department
Southside Police Department
Spanish Fort Police Department
Springville Police Department
Stevenson Police Department
Sulligent Police Department
Sumiton Police Department
Sylacauga Police Department
Sylvania Police Department
Talladega Police Department
Tallassee Police Department
Tarrant Police Department
Thomaston Police Department
Thomasville Police Department
Thorsby Police Department
Town Creek Police Department 
Town of Bon Air Police Department
Triana Police Department
Trinity Police Department
Troy Police Department
Trussville Police Department
Tuscaloosa Police Department
Tuscumbia Police Department
Tuskegee Police Department
Union Springs Police Department
Uniontown Police Department
Valley Police Department
Valley Head Police Department
Vance Police Department
Vernon Police Department
Vestavia Hills Police Department
Vincent Police Department
Wadley Police Department
Warrior Police Department
Weaver Police Department
Wedowee Police Department
West Blocton Police Department
Wetumpka Police Department
Wilsonville Police Department
Winfield Police Department
York Police Department

College and university agencies 

Alabama A&M University Police Department 
Alabama State University Police Department 
Auburn University Department of Public Safety 
Birmingham Southern College Police Department
Calhoun Community College Police Department
Faulkner University Police Department 
Gadsden State Community College Security and Safety Office
Jacksonville State University Police Department 
Jefferson State Community College Department of the Police 
Lawson State Community College Police Department 
Miles College Police Department 
Russell Community College Public Safety Department 
Samford University Police Department

Southern Union Community College Public Safety Department
Stillman College Police Department 
Tuskegee University Campus Police 
Troy University Police Department 
University of Alabama Police Department 
University of Alabama at Birmingham Police Department 
University of Mobile Department of Public Safety
University of Montevallo Department of Public Safety  
University of North Alabama Police Department 
University of South Alabama Police Department 
University of West Alabama Police Department
Wallace State Community College Police Department 
University of Alabama in Huntsville Police Department

Defunct,Federal and Local,Legislative,State agencies
The Alabama Law Enforcement Agency was formed on 1 January 2015 by the merger of the following state law enforcement agencies:

Federal law enforcement agencies operating within in Alabama
ATF
FBI
FBI Montgomery Headquarters Field Division Office
DEA
 Alabama Department of Homeland Security
 Alabama Department of Public Safety
 Alabama Bureau of Investigation 
 Alabama Fusion Center
 Alabama RSA Criminal Justice Information Center
 Alabama Marine Police
 Alabama Alcoholic Beverage Control Board Enforcement 
 Alabama Department of Revenue Enforcement
 Alabama Forestry Commission Investigations
 Alabama Agricultural and Industry Investigations 
 Alabama Public Service Commission Enforcement
 Alabama Office of Prosecution Service Computer Forensics

See also
 Law enforcement in the United States
 Federal law enforcement in the United States
 List of United States state and local law enforcement agencies

References

Alabama
Law
Law enforcement agencies